The Council for East and Central Africa Football Associations (officially abbreviated as CECAFA) is an association of the football playing nations in mostly East Africa and a bit of Central Africa. An affiliate of the Confederation of African Football (CAF), CECAFA is the oldest sub-regional football organisation on the continent.

History 
CECAFA was founded unofficially in 1927. The competition was sponsored by the major Nairobi-based soap-manufacturing firm Gossage, owned by the British Lever Brothers. Its formation is often misattributed to William Gossage, founder of the Gossage company. However, he died 50 years before the CECAFA was established.

The tournament was known as the "Gossage Cup" until the mid-sixties, when it was redubbed the "East African Challenge Cup".its consisted of only 12 teams

CECAFA's head offices are in Nairobi, Kenya. The first tournament was contested between Kenya and Uganda, which saw the Kenyan squad win the two legs 3–1 on aggregate.

Member associations 
All associations that joined in 1973 were founding members of CECAFA.

* Union of Arab Football Associations (UAFA) members are marked with an asterisk

Broadcasting rights 
In 2007, television rights for the tournament were sold to GTV. Since 2009, broadcasting of CECAFA competitions has been taken over by SuperSport.

Competitions

Current title holders

See also

Confederation of African Football (CAF)
West African Football Union (WAFU)
Central African Football Federations' Union (UNIFFAC)
Council of Southern Africa Football Associations (COSAFA)
Union of North African Football Federations (UNAF)

References

External links
 

CECAFA